Fox is a surname originating in England and Ireland. The derivation is from the Middle English "fox", itself coming from the Old English pre 7th century "fox". The surname first appears on record in the latter part of the 13th century, with the first recorded spelling in 1273 to be that of John Fox in the "Hundred Rolls of Yorkshire", England. In Ireland, Fox is mainly a translation of the Old Gaelic "Mac a'tSionnaigh" (son of the Fox).

Variants include Foxe and Foxx.

Some families with this name
 Fox sisters (19th century), American sisters credited as the creators of Spiritualism
 Robin Fox family of English actors, including Edward, James, Emilia, Laurence and Lydia Fox
 Fox-Strangways (originally Fox), family name of the Earls of Ilchester
 Lane Fox, a double-barrelled English surname

Notable persons with this surname

Actors
 Anne-Marie Fox (born 1962), American model and actress
 Bernard Fox (actor) (1927–2016), Welsh actor
 Colin Fox (actor) (born 1938), Canadian actor
 David Fox (actor) (1941–2021), Canadian actor
 Edward Fox (actor) (born 1937), English actor
 Emilia Fox (born 1974), English actress, daughter of actor Edward Fox
 Frank Fox (actor) in the 1938 film Second Thoughts
 Freddie Fox (actor) (born 1989), English actor
 Harry Fox (1882–1959), American actor
 Jack Fox (actor) (born 1985), English actor
 James Fox (born 1939), English actor
 Janet Fox (1912–2002), American actor
 Jorja Fox (born 1968), American actress
 Kerry Fox (born 1966), New Zealand actress
 Laurence Fox (born 1978), English actor, son of actor James Fox
 Matthew Fox (actor) (born 1966), American actor
 Megan Fox (born 1986), American actress
 Michael J. Fox (born 1961), Canadian-American actor, author, and activist
 Morgan Fox (model) (born 1970), Canadian model and actress
 Paul Fox (actor) (born 1979), British actor
 Philip Fox (actor) English film and television actor
 Robin Fox, father of actors Edward Fox and James Fox; see Robin Fox family
 Sandy Fox (born 1963), American voice actress
 Shayna Fox (born 1984), American voice actress
 Sidney Fox (1907–1942), American actress
 Spencer Fox (born 1993), voice actor
 Templeton Fox (1913–1993), American actress
 Vivica A. Fox (born 1964), American actress

Arts (other)
 Aaron Fox (musicologist) (contemporary), American musicologist
 Adam Fox (poet) (1883–1977), British poet
 Anna Maria Fox (1816–1897), English cultural promoter in Falmouth, Cornwall
 Annie Fox (author) (born 1950), American author
 Christopher Fox (composer) (born 1955), British composer
 Sir David Scott Fox (1910–1985), British diplomat and writer
 David Fox, pseudonym of Isabel Ostrander
 E. Phillips Fox (1865–1915), Australian painter
 Edward Fox (author) (born 1958), American author
 Ethel Carrick Fox (1872–1952), English-born painter better known as Ethel Carrick
 Everett Fox (contemporary), American scholar and translator of the Hebrew Bible
 Sir Frank Fox (author) (1874–1960), Australian journalist and author
 Frank Fox (composer) for films including The Master Detective
 Frank Fox (writer), see Screen Directors Playhouse
 Frederick A. Fox (1931–2011), American composer
 Gardner Fox (1911–1986), American writer
 George Fox (singer) (born 1960), Canadian country music singer
 Gill Fox (1915–2004), American cartoonist and animator
 Greg Fox (author) (born 1961), American author and cartoonist
 Hugo Fox (1897–1969), American bassoonist
 James Fox (singer) (born 1976), Welsh musician and songwriter
 John Foxe (1517–1587), English author 
 Josh Fox (contemporary) American director of documentaries
 Judy Fox (born 1957), American sculptor
 Justin Fox (born 1964), American financial journalist, commentator, and writer
 Levi Fox (1914–2006), director of the Shakespeare Birthplace Trust, England
 Lucas Fox (contemporary), British heavy metal musician
 Margalit Fox, American author
 Mary Fox (artist) (1922–2005), British artist
 Mem Fox (born 1946), Australian writer of children's books
 Neil Fox (broadcaster) (born 1961), English radio and television presenter
 Oz Fox Christian metal musician (born 1961)
 Paul Fox (musician) (1951–2007), British singer and guitarist
 Paul Fox (record producer), American record producer
 Paul Fox (producer), American record producer
 Peter Fox (artist) (born 1962), American painter
 Peter Fox (musician) (born 1971), singer Pierre Baigorry of the German band Seeed
 Rik Fox (born 1955), Polish-American musician
 Sally Fox (photographer) (1929–2006), American photographer and editor
 Samantha Fox (born 1966), British glamour model and singer
 Stephen Fox (author/educator) (born 1938), professor emeritus at Humboldt State University
 Steve Fox (musician), Canadian country-music singer/songwriter
 Toby Fox (born 1991), musician and video game designer
 Virgil Fox (1912–1980), American organist

Military
 Cecil H. Fox (1873–1963), British naval officer
 Charley Fox (1920–2008), Royal Canadian Air Force officer in World War II
 David G. Fox, U.S. Army officer
 Francis John Fox (1857–1902), New Zealand soldier and farmer
 Francis Lane Fox (1899–1989), British Army officer and Yorkshire landowner
 George Malcolm Fox (1843–1918), Inspector General of Gymnasia for the British Army at Aldershot
 Gustavus Fox (1821–1883), American naval officer in the Civil War
 Josiah Fox (1763–1847), Cornish-American naval architect
 Myles C. Fox (1918–1942), United States Marine Corps officer and Navy Cross recipient
 Paddy Fox (1933–2016), British recruiting sergeant and Chelsea Pensioner
 Wesley L. Fox (1931–2017), American US Marine, awarded the Medal of Honor

Politics and peerage
 Arthur Aloysius Fox (1847–1901), South Australian politician
 Ashley Fox (born 1969), English Conservative MEP, elected 2009
 Black Fox (Cherokee chief) (died 1811), Cherokee chief
 Charles James Fox (1749–1806), British politician
 Charles Richard Fox (1796–1873), illegitimate son of Henry Richard Vassall-Fox, 3rd Baron Holland
 Chauncey J. Fox (1797–1883), New York politician
 Chloë Fox (born 1971), Australian politician
 Claire Fox (born 1960), British political writer
 Colin Fox (politician) (born 1959), Scottish politician
 David Spencer Fox (1817–1901), American politician
 Francis Fox member of the Senate of Canada
 Galen Fox (born 1943), Hawaii politician and convicted sex offender
 Gary Fox (politician) (1943–2022), Canadian politician from Ontario
 Henry Fox, 1st Baron Holland (1705–1774), English nobleman and statesman
 Henry Richard Vassall-Fox, 3rd Baron Holland (1773–1840), English nobleman and politician
 Jamie Fox (born 1964), Canadian politician
 Jon Fox (1947–2018), American politician from Pennsylvania
 Liam Fox (born 1961), British politician from Woodspring
 Marcus Fox (1927–2002), British politician from Shipley
 Peter Fox (Canadian politician) (1921–1989), Canadian politician
 Sally Fox (politician) (1951–2014), American politician from Vermont
 Stanley Fox (1906–1984), Canadian politician from Manitoba
 Stanley H. Fox (contemporary), American politician from North Carolina
 Stephen Fox (1627–1716), English politician from Wiltshire
 Vicente Fox (born 1942), President of Mexico
 William Fox (politician) (1812–1893), Premier of New Zealand

Religion
 Edward Fox (bishop) (1496–1538), English churchman, Bishop of Hereford
 Emmet Fox (1886–1951), Irish spiritual leader of the early 20th century
 Francis Fox (divine) (1675–1738), English divine
 George Fox (1624–1691), English Dissenter and the founder of the Religious Society of Friends
 Joseph John Fox (1855–1915), American Roman Catholic bishop
 Matthew Fox (priest) (born 1940), American priest and theologian
 Peter Fox (bishop) (born 1952), British Anglican vicar and former bishop
 Richard Foxe (Prince Bishop, 1448–1528), English churchman, founder of Corpus Christi College, Oxford
 Tom Fox (Quaker) (1951–2006), Quaker peacemaker executed by insurgents in Iraq
 William Johnson Fox (1786–1864), English religious and political orator

Science, technology, engineering, mathematics
 Annette Baker Fox (1912–2011), American international relations scholar
 Brian Fox (computer programmer) (born 1959), software programmer
 Sir Charles Fox (civil and railway engineer) (1810–1874), English civil engineer
 Sir Charles Douglas Fox (1840–1921), British civil engineer
 Charles_Fox_(mathematician) (1897–1977), introduced Fox–Wright function and Fox H-function
 Cyril Fred Fox (1882–1967), English archaeologist
 Dixon Ryan Fox (1887–1945), American educator and researcher
 Fiona Fox (UK press officer) (born 1964), director of the UK Science Media Centre
 Sir Francis Fox (civil engineer) (1844–1927), English civil engineer
J. G. Fox (1916–1980), known as Jack, American nuclear physicist
 James Fox (engineer) (1780–1830), English machine tool maker
 John Fox (statistician) (born 1946), British statistician
 Kate Fox, British social anthropologist
 Mark S. Fox (born ca. 1952), Canadian computer scientist
 Marye Anne Fox (1947–2021), American chemist and university administrator
 Ralph Fox (1913–1973), American mathematician
 Robert Fortescue Fox (1858–1940), British physician
 Robin Fox (born 1934), anthropologist
 Samson Fox (1838–1903), British engineer, industrialist and philanthropist
 Sidney W. Fox (1912–1998), American biochemist
 Theodore Fortescue Fox (1899–1989), British physician and medical journal editor
 Wade Fox (1920–1964), American zoologist and herpetologist
 Wilfrid Fox (1875–1962), British dermatologist and horticulturist
 William Darwin Fox (1805–1880), English clergyman, naturalist, and cousin of Charles Darwin

Sports
 Adam Fox (ice hockey) (born 1998), player with New York Rangers
 Alicia Fox (born 1986), American professional wrestler and model
 Allen Fox (born 1939), American tennis player, coach, and author
 Andy Fox (born 1971), American baseball coach
 Bertil Fox (born 1951), British bodybuilder
 Billy Fox (boxer) (1926–1986), American boxer
 Chad Fox (born 1970), American baseball player
 Christian Fox (born 1981), Scottish footballer
 Danny Fox (born 1986), Scottish footballer
 David Fox (footballer) (born 1983), English footballer
 David Fox (swimmer) (born 1971), member of the USA 1996 Olympic team
 De'Aaron Fox (born 1997), American basketball player
 Denton Fox (1948–2013), American football player
 Deryck Fox (born 1964), British rugby league footballer and coach
 Don Fox (1935–2008), English rugby league footballer
 Francis Hugh Fox (1863–1952), English rugby player
 Frank Fox (American football) in 1965 American Football League draft
 Frank Fox (Gaelic footballer) (1911–1940), Irish Gaelic footballer
 Frank Fox (motorcycle racer) in 1957 Grand Prix motorcycle racing season
 Frank Fox (racing driver) (1877–1931), American auto racing driver
 Frank Fox (rugby league) (fl. 1960s and 1970s) rugby league footballer
 Frederick Fox (cricketer) (1863–1935), English cricketer
 Geoff Fox (footballer, born 1925) (1925–1994), English footballer
 Hannah Fox (born 1969), American boxer
 Hayden Foxe (born 1977), Australian football player
 Jack Fox (American football) (born 1996), American football player
 Jack Fox (baseball) (1885–1963), American professional baseball player
 Tiger Jack Fox (1907–1954), American light heavyweight boxer
 Jessica Fox (canoeist) (born 1994), French-born Australian slalom canoer
 John Fox (American football) (born 1955), American football coach
 Joshua Fox (born 1994), Fijian basketball player 
 Keyaron Fox, American football player
 Louis Fox (died c. 1866), American billiardist
 Lucius Fox (baseball) (born 1997), Bahamian baseball player
 Mike Fox (baseball coach), American college baseball coach
 Myriam Fox-Jerusalmi (born 1961), French world champion slalom canoer
 Nathan Fox (footballer), English footballer
 Nathan Fox (triple jumper), English triple jumper
 Neil Fox (cricketer) (born 1962), former English cricketer
 Neil Fox (rugby league) (born 1939), English rugby league footballer
 Nellie Fox (1927–1975), American baseball player
 Pat Fox (born 1962), Tipperary Hurling.
 Peter Fox (rugby league, born 1933), English player and coach
 Oscar Fox, Sr. (1889–1947), English footballer
 Oscar Fox, Jr. (1921–1990), English footballer; son of the above
 Peter Fox (footballer) (born 1957), English former footballer 
 Peter Fox (rugby league, born 1933) (1933–2019), English rugby league footballer and coach
 Peter Fox (rugby league, born 1984), English rugby league footballer
 Peter Fox (sailor) (born 1967), New Zealand sailor
 Richard Fox (canoeist) (born 1960), British kayaking champion
 Rick Fox (born 1969), Canadian basketball player and actor
 Ruel Fox (born 1968), English football player
 Stan Fox (1952–2000), American racing driver
 Tiger Jack Fox (1907–1954), American boxer
 Tim Fox (American football) (born 1953), American football player
 Tom Fox (rugby league), rugby league footballer of the 1930s
 Tomon Fox (born 1998), American football player
 Uffa Fox (1898–1972), English boat designer and sailing enthusiast
 Wilbur Fox (1919–1991), American professional basketball player

Other
 Anthony Fox Irish writer, producer, director, actor and founder of the New Theatre, Dublin
 Bernard Fox (Irish republican) (born 1951), hunger striker
 Charles Masson Fox (1866–1935), Cornish businessman 
 David Fox (disambiguation), various people with this name
 David Fox (game designer), multimedia producer
 Francis Fox (disambiguation), several persons
 Frank Fox (disambiguation)
 Frank S. Fox (1861–1920), American academic and college president
 Frank Fox, for whom Fox, Oklahoma was named
 Freddie Fox (disambiguation), multiple people
 Frederick Fox (disambiguation), multiple people
 Frederic Fox (1917–1981), Keeper of Princetoniana at Princeton University
 Frederick Fox (milliner) (1931–2013), Australian-born English milliner
 Jack Fox (disambiguation), multiple people
 Jennifer Fox (disambiguation), multiple people
Josephine Clardy Fox (1881–1970), American businesswoman and philanthropist
 Kathleen Fox (aviator) (born 1951), Canadian parachutist, pilot, flight instructor 
 Lindsay Fox (born 1937), Australian transport businessman
 Martin S. Fox (1924–2020), American publisher 
 Muriel Fox (born 1928), American public relations executive and feminist activist
 Neil Fox (disambiguation) (various)
 Neil Fox (broadcaster) (born 1961), English radio and television presenter
 Nikki Fox (born 1980), BBC disability news correspondent
 Paul Fox (disambiguation), various people with this name
 Paul S. Fox (1898–1972), American set decorator
 Sir Paul Fox (television executive) (born 1925), British television executive
 Peter Fox (disambiguation), various people with this name
 Peter Fox (character), a fictional character in the comic strip FoxTrot by Bill Amend
 Peter Fox (journalist) (died 1869), radical journalist active in England
 Peter Fox (librarian) (born 1949), British academic librarian
 Peter Fox (professor) (1959–2021), American professor at Rensselaer Polytechnic Institute
 Peter T. Fox, neuroimaging researcher and neurologist
 Richard Edwin Fox (1956–2003), American criminal
 Richard J. Fox, American property developer
 Robert Fox (disambiguation), various people with this name
 Rodney Fox, Australian scuba diver and filmmaker
 Sonny Fox (1925–2021), American television host
 Sonny Fox (XM Radio) (1947–2020), American DJ
 Stuart Fox (born 1978), English poker player
 Terry Fox (1958–1981), Canadian cancer treatment activist
 William Fox (producer) (1879–1952), founder of Fox Film Corporation

See also 
 Foxe (disambiguation)
 Foxx
 Fuchs (surname)
 Vos (surname)

References

Surnames of English origin
English-language surnames
Surnames from nicknames